EJH may refer to: 

 The airport code of Al Wajh Domestic Airport
 The initials of Emily J. Harding, used to sign some of her paintings and illustrations.
 Ned Eckersley, cricketer, often referred to as E. J. H. Eckersley on scorecards.
 EJH Corner